Timothy Esmonde Myers (born 17 September 1990) is a New Zealand footballer who plays for New Zealand club 3 Kings United and the New Zealand national football team. He also captains Team Nadi-NZ in local Fijian tournaments held at Bill McKinlay Park, Panmure.

International career
Myers represented New Zealand at 2007 FIFA U-17 World Cup playing the first two matches. He also played for the New Zealand Under-20 team at the 2008 OFC U-20 Championship as the Kiwis finished third place. In 2012, Myers was called up to the Under-23 team, winning the OFC U-23 Championship and qualifying to 2012 Olympic Football Tournament, where he played in one of New Zealand's games.

Myers was called to 2012 OFC Nations Cup and had his debut coming off the bench against Papua New Guinea, appearing in two other matches of the tournament.

International goals and caps
New Zealand's goal tally first.

International career statistics

References

External links
 
 nzfootball.co.nz

1990 births
Living people
Association footballers from Auckland
Waitakere United players
Association football forwards
New Zealand association footballers
New Zealand international footballers
Olympic association footballers of New Zealand
New Zealand youth international footballers
New Zealand under-20 international footballers
New Zealand under-23 international footballers
2012 OFC Nations Cup players
Footballers at the 2012 Summer Olympics